Michael Solomon Martin (born 1938) is a former Canadian politician. He represented the electoral district of Labrador South in the Newfoundland and Labrador House of Assembly from 1972 to 1975. He was a member of the New Labrador Party. He was born at Cartwright. Martin served in the Canadian Armed Forces where he served four missions as a United Nations peacekeeper. Martin is known for designing the unofficial Flag of Labrador in 1974.  He also designed the Labrador Tartan.

References

1938 births
Living people
People from Labrador
Members of the Newfoundland and Labrador House of Assembly
Labrador Party politicians